Robert Thorens (born 5 August 1908, date of death unknown) was a Swiss sailor. He competed in the Dragon event at the 1960 Summer Olympics.

References

External links
 

1908 births
Year of death missing
Swiss male sailors (sport)
Olympic sailors of Switzerland
Sailors at the 1960 Summer Olympics – Dragon
Sportspeople from Geneva
20th-century Swiss people